Nicolae Secăreanu (12 July 1901 - 29 September 1992) was a well-known Romanian opera singer and actor.

Filmography 

 The Lovers' Forest (1946)
 Forest of the Hanged (1964)
 Răscoala (1965)
 Faust XX (1966)
 The Dacians (1967)
 Tinerețe fără bătrânețe (1969)
 Căldura (1969)
 Die Lederstrumpferzählungen ("The Last of the Mohicans") (1969) - TV mini-series
 Mihai Viteazul (1970) - Sinan Pașa
 Săgeata căpitanului Ion (1972)
  (1973)
 August in Flames (1973) - TV movie
 Acţiunea Autobuzul  (1978)
 Vacanța cea mare (1988)

External links 

Page on Cinemagia

1901 births
1992 deaths
People from Teleorman County
Romanian male film actors
20th-century Romanian male actors